Shibi, literally Stone Wall, is one of four towns of Ninghua County, in western Fujian province, People's Republic of China, near the border with Jiangxi.

History
Shibi bills itself as the Cradle of the Hakkas for its place in Hakka history.

Republic of China
Year 2 : Tingzhou fu, the prefecture which oversees Ninghua, is renamed Changting (长汀).

Liberation
Tingzhou-fu/Changting is broken up; Ninghua and its towns now come under the new municipal region of Sanming.

Notes and references

Township-level divisions of Fujian